Oranges Are Not the Only Fruit is a 1990 BBC television drama, directed by Beeban Kidron. Jeanette Winterson wrote the screenplay, adapting her semi-autobiographical first novel of the same name (published 1985). The BBC produced and screened three episodes, running to a total of 2 hours and 45 minutes. The series was released on DVD in 2005.

The series won the BAFTA award for Best Drama.

Storyline
Charlotte Coleman starred as Jess, a girl growing up in a Pentecostal evangelical household in Accrington, Lancashire, England in the 1970s, who comes to understand that she is a lesbian. The allegorical fairytales that are woven into the novel do not appear on the screen. Miss Jewsbury's love-making with the underage Jess, which appears in the novel, was also excluded. Even with these cuts, the series caused controversy when shown due to the remaining lesbian sex scenes and its portrayal of the Elim Pentecostal faith.

Cast

 Jess - Charlotte Coleman
 Small Jess - Emily Aston
 Jess's mother - Geraldine McEwan
 Pastor Finch - Kenneth Cranham
 William - Peter Gordon
 Cissy - Barbara Hicks
 Elsie - Margery Withers
 May - Elizabeth Spriggs
 Mrs Green - Freda Dowie
 Miss Jewsbury - Celia Imrie
 Jess's real mum - Sophie Thursfield
 Mrs Arkwright - Pam Ferris
 Mrs Virtue - Katy Murphy
 Mrs Vole - Sharon Bower
 Doctor - David Thewlis
 Gypsy - Kay Clayton
 Church Pianist - Tamar Swade
 Melanie - Cathryn Bradshaw
 Graham - Richard Henders
 Katy - Tania Rodrigues
 Nurse - Suzanne Hall

Awards
The series won the BAFTA award for Best Drama.

In 1991, via the PBS network, the series won the GLAAD Media Award for Outstanding TV Movie or Limited Series.

In 2010, The Guardian ranked the serial at number 8 in their list of "The Top 50 TV Dramas of All Time".

Further reading
 Hallam, J. & Marshment, M. "Framing Experience: Case Studies in the Reception of Oranges Are Not the Only Fruit" Screen No. 36, 1995: pp. 1–15
 Hinds, H. ([1992] 1996) "Oranges Are Not The Only Fruit: reaching audiences other lesbian texts cannot reach" In: J. Corner & S. Harvey (eds) Television Times: A Reader London: Arnold, pp. 98–110;

References

External links
Oranges Are Not the Only Fruit at the British Film Institute

 
 

1990 British television series debuts
1990 British television series endings
1990s British drama television series
1990s British LGBT-related television series
1990s British LGBT-related drama television series
1990s British television miniseries
1990s LGBT-related drama television series
BBC television dramas
British LGBT-related drama television series
English-language television shows
Films directed by Beeban Kidron
Lesbian-related television shows
Television shows based on British novels
Television series set in the 1970s
Television shows set in Lancashire